Richard James Burrell (born 22 March 1959) is a British swimmer.

Swimming career
Burrell competed in two events at the 1984 Summer Olympics. He represented England and won a bronze medal in the 4 x 100 metres freestyle relay, at the 1978 Commonwealth Games in Edmonton, Alberta, Canada. Four years later, he represented England and won two silver medals in the 4 x 100 and 4 x 200 metres freestyle relays, at the 1982 Commonwealth Games in Brisbane, Queensland, Australia. He also won the 1978 ASA National Championship 100 metres freestyle title.

References

External links
 

1959 births
Living people
British male swimmers
Olympic swimmers of Great Britain
Swimmers at the 1978 Commonwealth Games
Swimmers at the 1984 Summer Olympics
Swimmers at the 1982 Commonwealth Games
Commonwealth Games silver medallists for England
Commonwealth Games bronze medallists for England
Commonwealth Games medallists in swimming
Sportspeople from Southampton
20th-century British people
21st-century British people
Medallists at the 1978 Commonwealth Games
Medallists at the 1982 Commonwealth Games